Ransom or Ransome is an English surname, also found in some trade names and military company names; it might derive either from the noun "ransom" or from contraction of "Ranulf's son". Notable people with the surname include:

Alured Ransom (1908–1992), American college football coach
Brayton H. Ransom (1879–1925), American zoologist and parasitologist 
Brian Ransom (politician) (1940–2020), Canadian politician
Brian Ransom (gridiron football) (born 1960), American player of gridiron football
Candice F. Ransom (born 1952), American author
Cody Ransom (born 1976), American professional baseball player
Emma S. Ransom (1864-1943), African-American educator and clubwoman
Epaphroditus Ransom (1798–1859), American state governor and state supreme court justice
Harry Ransom (1908–1976), chancellor of the University of Texas System
John Crowe Ransom (1888–1974), American poet, essayist, social and political theorist, man of letters, and academic
Matt Whitaker Ransom (1826–1904), American state politician and Civil War general
Melanie Ransom (living), Canadian politician
Mike Ransom (born 1977), American musician
P. J. G. Ransom (1935–2019), British non-fiction author
Reverdy Cassius Ransom (1861–1959), African American Christian socialist, civil rights activist, and Methodist bishop
Robert Ransom, Jr. (1828–1892), U.S. senator, civil engineer, and Civil War major general
Robin Ransom (born 1967), American judge
Thomas E. G. Ransom (1834–1864), American surveyor, civil engineer, real estate speculator, and Civil War general
Truman B. Ransom (1802 – 1847), Vermont educator and military officer who served as President of Norwich University and commander of a regiment in the Mexican–American War. He was killed at the Battle of Chapultepec.

Fictional characters:
 Cordelia Ransom, in David Weber's Honorverse series of novels
 Elwin Ransom, in C. S. Lewis's Space Trilogy
 Michael Ransom, from the films Strike Commando and Strike Commando 2

See also
 Ransome (surname)